Polygala amarella (or P. amara), commonly known as dwarf milkwort or Kentish milkwort, is a plant of the family Polygalaceae. A European native, it grows on chalky grass land and limestone mountain pastures.

In 2009 it featured on a first class Royal Mail stamp in the series "Endangered Plants".

References

amarella
Flora of Europe